In Hinduism, Dhata or Dhatri is the name of the solar deity, one of the Adityas.  He is also a god of health and magic. He is invoked in tantra by drawing tantras and chanting Vedic hymns. Often invoked during major yagnas such as Ashwamedha yagna.

Dhata is evidenced as an Aditya in both Hindu epics - the Mahabharata and the Ramayana. He is described to fought Arjuna and Krishna in burning of Khandava Forest episode in the epic Mahabharata. The Bhagavata Purana also mentions Dhata as the seventh son of Aditi and Kashyapa. In this text, he has four wives — Kuhu, Sinivali, Raka and Anumati — who gave birth to his sons — Sayam, Darsha, Pratar and Purnamasa respectively. In the Agni Purana, he is associated with the zodiac of Cancer and the colour yellow.

Notes

References
 

Health gods
Solar gods
Hindu gods
Adityas